Greendog: The Beached Surfer Dude! is a platform game developed by Interactive Designs for the Sega Genesis console, and was published by Sega in September 1992. A port to the handheld Game Gear was released a year later.

Plot
The eponymous protagonist of the story is Greendog, the player character, a laid-back, cool surfer and skater with a mop of bleached blonde hair. He has surfed most of the biggest waves around, including off the coast of Australia, California and in the Mediterranean, and is always in search of the biggest waves which will give him the biggest thrill and he cares for little else in life. He has numerous contraptions and toys, such as a gyrocopter, inline skates, a skateboard and an antique frisbee which could be very dangerous in the wrong hands. He does not say much except "dude" and "cool".

One day, while surfing in the Caribbean Sea off the coast of the Grenada islands, Greendog is knocked off his surfboard by the biggest freak wave he has ever seen, and falls unconscious in the sea. When he wakes on the beach, he is apparently in another version of our world, or at least some form of very vivid dreamworld, and a mysterious and apparently magical gold pendant is tied around his neck and he is unable to remove it. His girlfriend Bambi—a beautiful, buxom blonde woman in a red bikini—finds him and explains to Greendog that the pendant is of Aztec origin and carries a terrible curse; it dooms the wearer to be attacked by animals and wild primeval creatures and, worst of all, will prohibit surfing.

The only way that Greendog can lift the curse is to travel to a lost Aztec civilization and track down six pieces of a sacred Aztec treasure which were scattered across the Caribbean Islands, so that the pieces can be put back together, and ultimately so that Greendog can remove both the curse and the pendant. However, nobody knows exactly where the pieces of the treasure are.

Gameplay

The gameplay requires players to survive several side-scrolling levels, armed with only a flying disc that they can shoot at enemies to destroy them or at various objects such as totem poles, in order to obtain food and therefore reduce the damage meter.

The game has some homages to earlier side-scrolling adventure games, such as Pitfall! as the character often has to swing on vines to advance and many of the levels take place in a tropical jungle or in an ancient Mesoamerican temple. Many levels require the player to use a skateboard or inline skates to advance. The six levels cover the Caribbean islands of Grenada, Mustique, Curaçao, Jamaica, Saba, and finally St. Vincent. The latter level is in a volcanic state and is where the temple and final piece of treasure are found.

Reception
An October 1992 review in GameFan Magazine gave Greendog a rating of 71.5%. The game currently has some positive reviews on MobyGames which praise the innovative style and atmosphere of the game, especially the calypso music soundtrack, yet also stating that the platformer genre and the central character of "Greendog" were both lacking in originality.

In Retro Gamer, writer Ashley Day criticized Greendog, though she also stated "it's not a particularly bad game".  She called the game a clone of Pitfall! that suffers from poor character design.

Angry Video Game Nerd also reviewed this game in 2021 on his Youtube Channel.

References

External links

1992 video games
Platform games
Game Gear games
Sega video games
Sega Genesis games
Video games developed in the United States
Video games set in Curaçao
Video games set in Grenada
Video games set in Jamaica
Video games set in Saba
Video games set in Saint Vincent and the Grenadines
Single-player video games
Sega Technical Institute games